Laura Patch (born 21 June 1976) is a British comedy actor, best known for playing several characters in the Channel 4 series Star Stories alongside Kevin Bishop.

TV
 2002: Lexx, playing Piccalina Sternflanks in Series 4, Episode 14 "Prime Ridge".
 2003 and 2006: The Bill, playing Izzy Scott, then Mandy Francis.
 2006 – 2008: Star Stories playing Kate Moss, Christina Aguilera, Jennifer Aniston, Sarah Harding, Nicole Appleton, Emma Bunton, Katie Holmes, Paris Hilton, Shirlie Holliman, Rebecca Loos, Trudie Styler.
 2006: Life Begins, playing Tina.
 2008: Dolly and Laura, playing herself with Dolly Wells.
 2008: The IT Crowd, playing the Tour Guide in Series 3, Episode 3 "Tramps Like Us"
 2012: Being Human, playing Michaela Thompson
 2014: New Tricks, playing the Florist in Series 11, Episode 3 "Deep Swimming"
 2019-2020: After Life, playing Jill

Film
 1999: Distant Bridges, playing Amy Thompson.

2015: Black Mountain Poets

External links

 
 Clip from Dolly and Laura

1980 births
Living people
English television actresses
English film actresses